The 1920 Primera División was the ninth season of top-flight Peruvian football. A total of 9 teams competed in the league. The champion was Sport Inca.

League table

Standings

Title

External links
Peruvian Championship 
Peruvian Football League News 
La Liga Peruana de Football 

Peru
Peruvian Primera División seasons
1920 in Peruvian football